Frost King (foaled 1978 in Ontario) is a Canadian Thoroughbred Champion and Hall of Fame racehorse. Bred by Ted Smith of Rockwood, Ontario, he was sired by Manhattan Handicap winner, Ruritania. His dam was Native Flower whose sire, Restless Native, was a son of U.S. Racing Hall of Fame inductee, Native Dancer.

Frost King won an impressive total of 21 stakes races in his career.  He was inducted into the Canadian Horse Racing Hall of Fame in 1986.

References

1978 racehorse births
Thoroughbred family 4-m
Racehorses bred in Ontario
Racehorses trained in Canada
Sovereign Award winners
Canadian Thoroughbred Horse of the Year
Canadian Horse Racing Hall of Fame inductees